The revertive case is a grammatical case that transmits the sense of something going backwards to another. It can be found in Manchu language. 

Grammatical cases